"The real McCoy" is an idiom and metaphor used in much of the English-speaking world to mean "the real thing" or "the genuine article", e.g. "he's the real McCoy". The phrase has been the subject of numerous false etymologies.

History 
The phrase "The real McCoy" may be a corruption of the Scots "The real MacKay", first recorded in 1856 as: "A drappie o' the real MacKay" ("a drop of the real MacKay"). This appeared in a poem Deil's Hallowe'en published in Glasgow and is widely accepted as the phrase's origin. A letter written by the Scottish author Robert Louis Stevenson in 1883 contains the phrase, "He’s the real Mackay". In 1935, New Zealand mystery writer Ngaio Marsh presented a character in Enter a Murderer who muses whether gun cartridges used in a play were "the real Mackay."<ref>Ngaio Marsh: A Man Lay Dead, Enter a Murderer, The Nursing Home Mystery p. 262 Harper London UK (2009)</ref>

In 1881, the expression was used in James S. Bond's The Rise and Fall of the 'Union Club'; Or, Boy Life in Canada. A character says, "By jingo! yes; so it will be. It's the 'real McCoy,' as Jim Hicks says. Nobody but a devil can find us there."

The expression has also been associated with Elijah McCoy's oil-drip cup invention, patented in 1872. One theory is that railroad engineers looking to avoid inferior copies would request it by name, inquiring if a locomotive was fitted with 'the real McCoy system". This possible origin is mentioned in Elijah McCoy's biography at the National Inventors Hall of Fame. The original appearance of this claim in print can be traced to an advertisement which appeared in the December 1966 issue of Ebony.  The ad, for Old Taylor Bourbon whiskey, ends with the tag line: "...but the most famous legacy McCoy left his country was his name."

In the 1996 documentary The Line King, caricaturist Al Hirschfeld attributed the phrase to his friend, 1930s pioneer radio host George Braidwood McCoy, who proved he could live off the land without paying for food or rent. During the 1939 World's Fair he ate free food from the exhibitions, slept complimentary at the Royal Scot, shaved using the new electric shavers at the display exhibits, and earned spending money by selling his story to Life''. During the Second World War, McCoy could be heard broadcasting his radio show in 1944 Rome, where he would sign off saying: "This is Sergeant George (The Real) McCoy folding his microphone and silently stealing away."

Alternative attributions include:
A dispute between two branches of the Scots Clan Mackay over who was rightful leader. Lord Reay headed one branch and he came to be known as the Reay Mackay which migrated to 'the real McCoy'. See Huistean Du Mackay, 13th of Strathnaver for information about the dispute.
Joseph McCoy (1837–1915) was mayor of Abilene, Kansas and styled himself 'the real McCoy'.
The Hatfield–McCoy feud

Kid McCoy
In the United States, the phrase became associated with boxer Kid McCoy. Quinion notes that "It looks very much – without being able to say for sure – as though the term was originally the real Mackay, but became converted to the real McCoy in the U.S., either under the influence of Kid McCoy, or for some other reason."

This is also a reference to the rum runner Bill McCoy who legally sold rum during prohibition. Others watered theirs down and he didn’t. That led to people saying they wanted “the real McCoy”

In popular music 
In 1938, the composer and song writer Cole Porter used the phrase “Or is what I feel the real McCoy?” in his popular song "At Long Last Love" for his musical "You Never Know".

Pianist McCoy Tyner's famed Blue Note Records release in 1967 was eponymously entitled "The Real McCoy".

In 1976, the reggae and disco artist Van McCoy also released an eponymous album called "The Real McCoy".

Real McCoy is a Eurodance group best known for their 1993 single "Another Night".

In 1988, "The Real McCoy" is a song from the Scottish rock band The Silencers.

The Swedish band Troll used the phrase in their song "Jimmy Dean" (1989) about James ‘Jimmy’ Dean (1931–1955).

Connie Converse used the phrase in her song "Playboy of the Western World".

Kid Rock has used the phrase in his songs "My Name is Rock", and in "Cowboy".

In the Disney Channel show, Hannah Montana, in the song "Gonna Get This", the phrase is used with Miley Cyrus singing the line, “The honest truth, the Real McCoy”.

In the title track of their 1986 album Music That You Can Dance To, the American pop band Sparks sang “Get yourself in tune for the real McCoy”.

The phrase “Sit back and enjoy / The real McCoy” was used in the Siouxsie and the Banshees track "Monitor" off their 1981 album Juju.

In popular media 
In "Star Trek: The Original Series", the episode "The Man Trap" by George Clayton Johnson featured a polymorphic alien that at one point looked like Dr. McCoy. James Blish renamed the story "The Unreal McCoy" in Bantam Books' "Star Trek", which was the first of a series of anthologies that were short story adaptations of the original Star Trek episodes.

See also 

 No true Scotsman
 True Scotsman
 Buffalo Log

References

External links

English phrases
English-language idioms